Techiman Municipal District is one of the eleven districts in Bono East Region, Ghana. Originally created as an ordinary district assembly on 10 March 1989 when it was known as Techiman District, until the northern part of the district was split off to create Techiman North District on 28 June 2012; thus the remaining part has been retained as Techiman District, which it was later elevated to municipal district assembly status and has been renamed as Techiman Municipal District on that same year. The municipality is located in the western part of Bono East Region and has Techiman as its capital town.

List of settlements

Sources
 
 District: Techiman Municipal District

References

Districts of Bono East Region